Interlink is the EFTPOS division of Visa, operating mainly in the United States. Contrary to a regular Visa check card purchase, an Interlink transaction is authenticated using a personal identification number and offers the possibility of obtaining cash back (purchase and withdrawal) from a merchant.

See also
Debit card

External links
Interlink Merchant locator

Banking terms
Interbank networks
Debit cards
Financial services companies of the United States